A list of British films released in 1937.

1937

See also
 1937 in British music
 1937 in British television
 1937 in the United Kingdom

References

External links
 

1937
Films
Lists of 1937 films by country or language
1930s in British cinema